Do Rio a São Paulo Para Casar (From Rio to Sao Paulo to get married) is a 1922 Brazilian silent romance film directed by José Medina.

The film premiered on 30 April 1922 in Rio de Janeiro.

Cast
Waldemar Moreno
Antônio Marques Costa Filho
Nicola Tartaglione
Maria Fuína
Regina Fuína
Carlos Ferreira
J. Guedes de Castro
José Medina

References

External links
 

1920s romance films
1922 films
Brazilian black-and-white films
Brazilian silent films
Brazilian romance films